Lokoja Palm was a  cargo ship built by Shipbuilding Corporation Ltd, Low Walker, Sunderland, in 1947. She was laid down as Empire Birdsay and launched as Zarian. In 1949 she was sold and renamed Lokoja Palm. Towards the end of her career she was sold and renamed Despina L and then Nova registered in Cyprus, being scrapped in December 1971 in Shanghai.

Description
Empire Birdsay was ordered by the Ministry of War Transport but the war ended before she was completed. She was built by Shipbuilding Corporation Ltd, Newcastle upon Tyne. She  was yard number 21 and was launched as Zarian on 16 August 1947 with completion in December.

Career
Zarian was owned and operated by the United Africa Co Ltd. In 1949, the company became Palm Line Ltd and she was renamed Lokoja Palm.  On 16 December 1954, Lokoja Palm arrived at Avonmouth, Somerset with a cargo including 40 animals destined for London Zoo. Lokoja Palm served with Palm Line for seventeen years and was sold in 1966 to Compagnia Navigazione Kea, Panama and renamed Despina L. In 1969, she was sold to Nova Shipping Co Ltd, Cyprus and renamed Nova. She was operated under the management of Pergamos Shipping Co Ltd. Nova was scrapped in China in December 1971.

Propulsion

References

Further reading
"A voyage too far", Ships Monthly March 1995.

External links
 Photo of Lokoja Palm

1947 ships
Ships built on the River Tyne
Empire ships
Ministry of War Transport ships
Merchant ships of the United Kingdom
Steamships of the United Kingdom
Merchant ships of Panama
Steamships of Panama
Merchant ships of Cyprus
Steamships of Cyprus